Katharine Elizabeth McBride (1904 - 1976) was an American academic in the fields of psychology and neuropsychology. She served as the fourth president of Bryn Mawr College from 1942 until 1970.

Early life and education
Katherine McBride was born May 14, 1904, in Philadelphia. She received her A.B. cum laude in 1925, her M.A. in 1927, and her Ph.D. in 1932, all from Bryn Mawr College. While a graduate student at Bryn Mawr College, McBride's dissertation advisor was James Leuba, the founder of Bryn Mawr's psychology research lab. In 1929, Katherine McBride was invited by neurologist, Dr. Theodore Weisenberg, to join an aphasia study. McBride had recently collaborated with Dr. Agnes Rogers, and Dr. Rogers recommended McBride to Dr. Weisenburg for the study. The study was funded, spanned five years and focused on the classification and assessment of aphasia in adults.

Aphasia study 
The aphasia study included 230 patients and healthy adults, including 60 patients with aphasia. The study was monumental because it was the first aphasia study to use normal controls, to compare patients with and without aphasia, and to use standardized methodology. 

McBride and Weisenberg were influenced by Henry Head's (1926) work on aphasia and his process for testing patients with aphasia. McBride used a subset of Head's individual tests for their assessment battery, but also supplemented the tests by adding measures of reading, writing, mathematics, and language intelligence. She also added a subset of non-language tests to the battery. In total, McBride and Weisenberg's battery for aphasia included tasks that assessed word repetition, naming, automatic word sequences, understanding spoken language, reading, writing, sentence completion, understanding analogies and opposites, digit and letter span, and sound recognition. The average length of the battery was 19 hours for aphasia patients and only 10 to 15 hours for controls. 

Only weeks after the final manuscript of the book was sent to the Commonwealth Fund in New York City for publication, Weisenberg died. McBride did not continue research in clinical neuropsychology and instead switched her focus to educational psychology.

Career 
By 1938, Katherine McBride became an associate professor at Bryn Mawr in both the Education and Psychology departments. In 1938, she was also appointed Assistant Dean at Bryn Mawr. In 1940, she left Bryn Mawr to become the Dean at Radcliffe College in Boston. On November 28, 1941, Katherine McBride became one of the youngest people to be named the president of an American university. She was also one of the few female presidents of American colleges at the time. 

Katherine McBride was the fourth president of Bryn Mawr college. As President, she advocated for her students by turning down government scholarship programs that required universities to report student protesters during the Vietnam War. In McBride's first year as president, she taught Child Psychology and co-led the Psychology Journal Club. McBride also was the Vice President of the College of Entrance Examination Board and Chair of the Committee on Tests. Even though not technically a practicing neuropsychologist, McBride continued to value standardization, confront measurement issues and develop test instruments. McBride was an active member of the American Psychological Association. She was elected a Fellow of the American Academy of Arts and Sciences in 1968.

McBride developed the Child Study Institute, a clinical, educational service that in present-day serves as a mental-health services center. She also oversaw the construction of the Mariam Coffin Canaday Library, Erdman Hall, Haffner Hall, and additions to the Park Science Center.

McBride made a televised appearance on ABC News Issues and Answers program on September 19, 1965. To a national audience, she espoused her beliefs in equality in higher education, and that greater assistance was needed for disadvantaged individuals to even the playing field in higher education. Katherine McBride died on June 3, 1976 after sustaining a heart attack.

Legacy 
The “McBride Scholars” program was established in 1984. The Scholarship supports nontraditional, female college students who delayed college due to economic or family issues.  The McBride Gateway in front of Pembroke Hall at Bryn Mawr College was erected in 1984 to honor Katherine McBride. A chapter of The Oxford Handbook of History of Clinical Neuropsychology was devoted to Katharine McBride's contributions, and the author stated, “It can be argued that McBride was one of the best neuropsychologists we never had. Overall, she is considered to be a pioneering figure among early aphasia clinicians and researchers who founded the field of clinical neuropsychology.

Quotes
From her research she internalized what she called "an inclination to ask about every event or kind of behavior, 'What can we learn from this?'"

Works
 McBride, K. E. (1932). A psychological study of aphasia. Unpublished dissertation, Bryn Mawr College.
 Weisenburg, T. H., & McBride, K. E. (1935). Aphasia: A clinical and psychological study. New York, NY: The Commonwealth Fund.
 Weisenburg, T. H., Roe, A., & McBride, K. E. (1936). Adult intelligence: A psychological study of test performances. New York, NY: The Commonwealth Fund.
 McBride, K. E. (1941). Henry Head: 1861–1940. The American Journal of Psychology, 54, 444–446.
 McBride, K. E. (1950). Review of “Language and language disturbances: Aphasic symptom complexes and their significance for medicine and the theory of language.” Journal of Abnormal and Social Psychology, 45, 404–405.     
 McBride, K. E. (1972). Higher education and the pace of change (Vol. 1971). [Pittsburgh]: University of Pittsburgh Press.

References

External links

Presidents of Bryn Mawr College
1904 births
1976 deaths
Bryn Mawr College alumni
Educators from Philadelphia
American women educators
Fellows of the American Academy of Arts and Sciences
20th-century American women
20th-century American people
Women heads of universities and colleges
20th-century American academics